Michael Ash may refer to:
Michael Woolston Ash (1789–1858), member of the U.S. House of Representatives from Pennsylvania
Michael Edward Ash (1927–2016), British mathematician and brewer
Mick Ash (born 1943), English footballer